Deer stones (also known as reindeer stones) are ancient megaliths carved with symbols found largely in Siberia and Mongolia. The name comes from their carved depictions of flying deer. There are many theories to the reasons behind their existence and the people who made them.

Construction
Deer stones are usually constructed from granite or greenstone, depending on which is the most abundant in the surrounding area. They have varying heights; most are over 3 feet tall, but some reach a height of 15 feet. The tops of the stones can be flat, round or smashed, suggesting that perhaps the original top had been deliberately destroyed. The stones are usually oriented with the decorated face to the east.

The carvings and designs were most usually completed before the stone was erected, though some stones show signs of being carved in place. The designs were pecked or ground into the stone surface. Deep-grooved cuts and right-angle surfaces indicate the presence of metal tools. Stone tools were used to smooth the harsh cuts of some designs. Nearly all the stones were hand carved, but some unusual stones show signs that they could have been cut with a primitive type of mechanical drill.

Types of stones 
V. V. Volkov, in his thirty years of research, classified three distinct types of deer stones.

Classic Mongolian
These stones are fairly detailed and more elegant in their depiction methods. They usually feature a belted warrior with a stylized flying red deer on his torso.  This type of stone is most prominent in southern Siberia and northern Mongolia. This concentration suggests that these stones were the origin of the deer stone tradition, and further types both simplified and elaborated on these.

West Asian-European
These stones feature a central region of the stone, sectioned off by two "belts", horizontal lines. There are also "earring hoops", large circles, diagonal slashes in groups of two and three known as "faces", and "necklaces", collection of stone pits resembling their namesake.

Sayan-Altai
The Sayan-Altai stones feature some of the West Asian-European markings, including free-floating, straight-legged animals, daggers and other tools. The appearance of deer motifs is markedly diminished, and those that do appear often do not emphasise the relationship between reindeer and flying. The Sayan-Altai stones can be sub-divided into two types:
 The Gorno-Altai stones have simple warrior motifs, displaying tools in the belt region of the stone. Reindeer motifs appear but are few.
 The Sayan-Tuva stones are similar to the Gorno-Altai but contain fewer images of animals. No deer motifs are present. The artistic style is much simpler, often consisting of only belts, necklaces, earrings and faces.

Imagery

There are many common images that appear in deer stones, as well as a multitude of ways they are presented.

Reindeer
Reindeer feature prominently in nearly all of the deer stones.  Early stones have very simple images of reindeer, and as time progresses, the designs increase in detail.  A gap of 500 years results in the appearance of the complicated flying reindeer depiction.  Reindeer are depicted as flying through the air, rather than merely running on land.  The anthropologist Piers Vitebsky has written, "The reindeer is depicted with its neck outstretched and its legs flung out fore and aft, as if not merely galloping but leaping through the air." The antlers, sometimes appearing in pairs, have become extremely ornate, utilizing vast spiral designs that can encompass the entire deer. These antlers sometimes hold a sun disc or other sun-related image.  Other artwork from the same period further emphasizes the connection between the reindeer and the sun, which is a very common association in Siberian shamanism. Tattoos on buried warriors contain deer, featuring antlers embellished with small birds' heads. This reindeer-sun-bird imagery perhaps symbolizes the shaman's spiritual transformation from the earth to the sky: the passage from earthly life to heavenly life. As these deer images also appear in warrior tattoos, it is possible that reindeer were believed to offer protection from dangerous forces. Another theory is that the deer spirit served as a guide to assist the warrior soul to heaven.

Other animals
Particularly in the Sayan-Altai stones, a multitude of other animals are present in deer stone imagery.  One can see depictions of tigers, pigs, cows, horse-like creatures, frogs and birds. Unlike the reindeer, however, these animals are depicted in a more natural style. This lack of ornate detailing indicates the lack of supernatural importance of such animals, taking an obvious backseat against the reindeer. The animals are often paired off with one another in confrontation, e.g. a tiger confronting a horse in a much more earthly activity.

Weapons and tools

Weapons and tools can be seen throughout all the stones, though weapons make a strong appearance in the Sayan-Altai stones. Bows and daggers crop up frequently, as well as typical Bronze-Age implements, such as fire-starters or chariot reins. The appearance of these tools helps date the stones to the Bronze Age.

Patterns
Chevron patterns crop up occasionally, usually in the upper regions of the stone.  These patterns can be likened to military shields, suggesting the stones' connection to armed conflict.  It has also been suggested that chevron patterns could be a shamanic emblem representing the skeleton.

Human faces
Human faces are a much rarer occurrence and are usually carved into the top of the stone.  These faces are carved with an open mouth, as though singing. This also suggests a religious/shamanistic connection of the deer stone, as vocal expression is a common and important theme in shamanism.

Geographic distribution
Archaeologists have found over 1500 deer stones in Eurasia. Over 1300 of them were recorded in the territory of modern Mongolia.  Similar images are found in a wider area, as far west as Kuban, Russia; the Southern Bug in the Ukraine; Dobruja, Bulgaria; and the Elbe, which flows through the Czech Republic and Germany.

Origin and purpose

Deer stones were probably originally erected by Bronze Age nomads around 1000 BCE though further research into the Cimmerian stone stelae-Kurgan stelae should be taken into much consideration. Later cultures have often reused the stones in their own burial mounds (known as kheregsüürs) and for other purposes. Modern vandals have also defaced and even looted the stones.

In 1892, V.V. Radlov published a collection of drawings of deer stones in Mongolia. Radlov's drawings showed the highly stylized images of deer on the stones, as well as the settings in which they were placed. Radlov showed that in some instances the stones were set in patterns suggesting the walls of a grave, and in other instances, the deer stones were set in elaborate circular patterns, suggesting use in rituals of unknown significance.

In 1954 A.P. Okladnikov published a study of a deer stone found in 1856 by D.P. Davydov near modern Ulan-Ude now known as the Ivolga stone, displayed in the Irkutsk State Historical Museum. Okladinkov identified the deer images as reindeer, dated the stone's carving to the 6th-7th Centuries BC, and concluded from its placement and other images that it was associated with funerary rituals, and was a monument to a warrior leader of high social prominence.

A extensive 1981 study by V.V. Volkov identified two cultural conditions behind the deer stones. The eastern deer stones appear to be associated with cemeteries of the Slab Grave culture. The other cultural tradition is associated with the circular structures suggesting use as the center of rituals.

There are several proposed theories for the purpose of the deer stones. There are different viewpoints about the origins of deer stone art. According to H.L. Chlyenova, the artistic deer image originated from the Sak tribe and its branches (Chlyenova 1962). Volkov believes that some of the methods of crafting deer stone art are closely related to Scythians (Volkov 1967), whereas Mongolian archaeologist D. Tseveendorj regards deer stone art as having originated in Mongolia during the Bronze Age and spread thereafter to Tuva and the Baikal area (Tseveendorj 1979). D. G. Savinov (1994) and M. H. Mannai-Ool (1970) have also studied deer stone art and have reached other conclusions. The stones do not occur alone, usually with several other stone monuments, sometimes carved, sometimes not.  The soil around these gatherings often contains traces of animal remains, for example, horses. Such remains were placed underneath these auxiliary stones. Human remains, on the other hand, were not found at any of the sites, which discredits the theory that the stones could function as gravestones. The markings on the stones and the presence of sacrificial remains could suggest a religious purpose, perhaps a prime location for the occurrence of shamanistic rituals. Some stones include a circle at the top and stylised dagger and belt at the bottom, which has led some scholars, such as William Fitzhugh, to speculate that the stones could represent a spiritualized human body, particularly that of a prominent figure such as a warrior or leader. This theory is reinforced by the fact that the stones are all very different in construction and imagery, which could be because each stone tells a unique story for the individual it represents.

In 2006, the Deer Stone Project of the Smithsonian Institution and Mongolian Academy of Sciences began to record the stones digitally with 3-D laser scanning.

See also

 Carlin stone
 Dolmens 
 Gowk Stone
 List of megalithic sites
 Megalith
 Menhir
 Obelisk
 Santa's reindeer
 Standing stone
 Statue menhir

References

Sources
 Eric A. Powell - Mongolia (Archaeology magazine January/February 2006)
Jacobson, Esther, The Deer Goddess of Ancient Siberia BRILL, 1993   
Masson, Vadim, History of Civilizations of Central Asia, Volume 1 Motilal Banarsidass Publ., 1999 
Cremin, Aedeen, Archaeologica: The World's Most Significant Sites and Cultural Treasures frances lincoln ltd, 2007  p 236
History of Civilizations of Central Asia UNESCO, 1992  
Magail Jérôme (2004).– Les « Pierres à cerfs » de Mongolie, cosmologie des pasteurs, chasseurs et guerriers des steppes du Ier millénaire avant notre ère. International Newsletter on Rock Art, Editor Dr Jean Clottes, n° 39, pp. 17–27. 
Magail Jérôme (2005a).– Les « Pierres à cerfs » de Mongolie. Arts asiatiques, revue du Musée national des Arts asiatiques –Guimet, n° 60, pp. 172-180. 
Magail Jérôme (2005b).– Les « pierres à cerfs » des vallées Hunuy et Tamir en Mongolie, Bulletin du Musée d’Anthropologie préhistorique de Monaco, Monaco, n° 45, pp. 41–56. 
Magail Jérôme (2008).– Tsatsiin Ereg, site majeur du début du Ier millénaire en Mongolie. Bulletin du Musée d’Anthropologie préhistorique de Monaco, 48, pp. 107-120. 
Savinov D.G. : Савинов Д. Г. (1994).- Оленные камни в культуре кочевников Евразии. Санкт-Петербург, 209 с.
Volkov,V.V. (1995). - Chapter 20 Early Nomads of Mongolia in Nomads of the Eurasian Steppes in the Early Iron Age Edited by Davis-Kimball, J. et al. 
Volkov V.V. : Волков В.В. (1981).- Оленные камни Монголии. Улан-Батор.
Volkov V.V. : Волков В.В. (2002).- Оленные камни Монголии. Москва.

External links
A collection of images of deer stones throughout Mongolia

Megalithic monuments
Monuments and memorials in Mongolia